MV Rozi was a tugboat, built in Bristol in 1958. She was originally called Rossmore, and was later renamed Rossgarth. She was sold to Tug Malta in 1981 as the Rozi and operated in the Grand Harbour. After being decommissioned, she was scuttled off Ċirkewwa as an artificial reef. It is now one of the most popular dive sites in Malta.

History
MV Rozi was built in Bristol in 1958 by Charles Hill & Sons Ltd, for Warren Johnston Lines Ltd of Liverpool. Her original name was Rossmore. In 1969 she was sold to Rea Towing Company and renamed Rossgarth. In 1972 she was sold to Mifsud Brothers Ltd, and operated for Malta Ship Towage Ltd, retaining its same name. She left Liverpool and began her career in Malta.

The tugboat was sold to Tug Malta in 1981 and was renamed Rozi. After many years operating in Grand Harbour, she was decommissioned and sold to Captain Morgan Cruises. They scuttled the tugboat off Ċirkewwa in September 1992 for their Underwater Safari Tours. These tours no longer operate, but the site is now a popular dive site which attracts hundreds of divers from around the world.

Dive site
It is intact except for its engines and propeller. The wreck is full of marine life, including sea breams, scorpionfish, rainbow wrasses and cardinal fish.

The site is easily accessible from the nearby Ċirkewwa Harbour and is located close to the wreck of the patrol boat P29.

References

Tugboats
Ships built in Bristol
1958 ships
Ships of Malta
Shipwrecks of Malta
Ships sunk as artificial reefs
Maritime incidents in 1992
Ships sunk as dive sites
Underwater diving sites in Malta
Mellieħa